Ghost Shark 2: Urban Jaws is a 2015 New Zealand supernatural horror film directed by Andrew Todd and Johnny Hall. It was shot on a Canon 550D in Auckland, New Zealand, with additional shooting taking place in Christchurch and Los Angeles.

Plot

The plot concerns the mayor of Auckland and an "expert ghost shark hunter" as they fight to save the city from a supernatural beast known as Ghost Shark. Despite being labelled "Ghost Shark 2", it is not related to SyFy's Ghost Shark, and the decision to make it a sequel was made for narrative reasons. The tone of the film is that of a serious drama, despite the seemingly parodic subject material.

Cast
 Campbell Cooley as Mayor Jack Broody
 Johnny Hall as Tom Logan
 Steve Austin as Tony Palantine
 Kathleen Burns as Emily Morgan
 Roberto Nascimento as Marco Guerra
 Isabella Burt as Martina Guerra
 Stig Eldred as Sean Logan
 Juliette Danielle as Elsie Grey
 David Farrier as himself

Production
Ghost Shark 2 originated as a faux trailer in the vein of Hobo with a Shotgun, released on YouTube on 14 August 2010. Several websites and blogs took notice, and the trailer got posted on many websites like Cinefantastique, SlashFilm, Premiere.fr., and CBSSports.com The online attention prompted the directors to turn the faux trailer into a feature film, and production on this feature version began in Auckland in October 2010, with further shooting taking place in Christchurch. A second teaser was released on Christmas Day 2010 along with behind-the-scenes photos and information on the official website. A third trailer was released on 14 August 2013. One scene in the film features actors George Hardy (Troll 2), Juliette Danielle (The Room), and Alan Bagh (Birdemic: Shock and Terror) in small roles. It represents the first time actors from these three so-called "Best Worst" movies have performed together. The scene was filmed in Los Angeles by second-unit director Doug Dillaman. However, the scene was eventually deleted, with only a separate cameo scene with Danielle left in the film.

References

External links
 Ghost Shark 2: Urban Jaws Official Site
 

2015 films
2015 horror films
2010s supernatural horror films
2010s ghost films
New Zealand horror films
Films set in Auckland
Films shot in Los Angeles
Films shot in New Zealand
Films about shark attacks
Unofficial sequel films
2010s English-language films